Skudai (also spelled Sekudai) is a suburb in Iskandar Puteri, Johor Bahru District, Johor, Malaysia. Skudai is part of the new growth corridor of southwest Johor. Its population ranges between 160,000 and 210,000. It houses the Paradigm Mall Johor and the headquarters of the Iskandar Puteri City Council, and is home to the Universiti Teknologi Malaysia campus.

Government
Since 2022, the Dewan Rakyat parliamentary constituency of Iskandar Puteri (P162) is represented by Liew Chin Tong from Democratic Action Party (DAP) while the Johor State Assembly seat of Skudai is represented by Marina Ibrahim from the Democratic Action Party (DAP),who is also the first DAP Skudai Malay MLA. 

For the 2018-2022 term, the Dewan Rakyat parliamentary constituency of Iskandar Puteri (renamed from Gelang Patah) (P162) is represented by Lim Kit Siang from Democratic Action Party (DAP) while the Johor State Assembly seat of Skudai is represented by Tan Hong Pin from the Democratic Action Party (DAP). 

For the 2013-2018 term, the Dewan Rakyat parliamentary constituency of Gelang Patah (P162) is represented by Lim Kit Siang Democratic Action Party (DAP) while the Johor State Assembly seat of Skudai is represented by Boo Cheng Hau from the Democratic Action Party (DAP), who is also the former of the Johor State legislative assembly opposition leaders.

For the 2008-2013 term, the Dewan Rakyat parliamentary constituency of Gelang Patah (P162) was represented by Tan Ah Eng of the Malaysian Chinese Association (MCA) while the Johor State Assembly seat of Skudai was represented by Boo Cheng Hau from the Democratic Action Party (DAP).

Education

Universities
 Universiti Teknologi Malaysia
 Southern University College

Secondary Schools in Skudai
SMK TAMAN TUN AMINAH
SMK TAMAN SKUDAI BARU
SMK TAMAN DAMAI JAYA
SMK TAMAN SELESA JAYA 1
SEKOLAH MENENGAH KEBANGSAAN TAMAN SELESA JAYA 2
SMK UNIVERSITI
SEKOLAH MENENGAH TAMAN UNIVERSITI 2
SEKOLAH MENENGAH KEBANGSAAN SKUDAI
SEKOLAH MENENGAH TAMAN DESA SKUDAI
SMK TAMAN MUTIARA RINI 1
SMK TAMAN MUTIARA RINI 2
SEKOLAH MENENGAH ISLAM HIDAYAH
SEKOLAH MENENGAH SRI PULAI PERDANA

Primary schools
SJK(C) Pu Sze
SJK(C)Kuo Kuang
SJK(C)Kuo Kuang 2
SJK(T)Taman Tun Aminah
SJK(T) Rini
SK Taman Damai Jaya
SK Taman Selesa Jaya
SK Taman Skudai Baru
SK Sekudai Batu 10
SK Sri Skudai
SK Taman Desa Skudai
SK Taman Universiti 1
SK Taman Universiti 2
SK Taman Universiti 3
SK Taman Universiti 4
SK Sri Pulai Perdana

Demographics

Most of Skudai's residents are of Chinese descent (54.5%), followed by Malays (31.5%) and Indians (13.6%).

Tourist attractions
Skudai, which is geographically located in the center of Johor, is the shopping district of the state. It has a large number of shopping centres built around Skudai. The famous shopping mall is the Paradigm Mall which is connected to Hyatt Place (under-construction). This mega mall houses a large cinema, ice skating ring, indoor skateboard park, indoor rock climbing facilities, Uniqlo, H&M, Cotton On, home pro, Harvey Norman, and many many more. The other shopping centres that are in and within Skudai are Skudai Parade, AEON Taman Universiti, Tasek Sentral, The Store in Taman Ungku Tun Aminah, Sutera Mall in Taman Sutera Utama, U Mall in Taman Pulai Utama and Giant Hypermarket, which is situated along the Jalan Skudai.

Transportation
The area is easily accessible via CIQ or Senai Airport. It is accessible by Muafakat Bus route P-403. or Causeway Link (5B, 51B) from Johor Bahru Sentral railway station.

References

Townships in Johor
Towns and suburbs in Johor Bahru District